Amani Alaa (Arabic: أماني علاء ;June 18, 1994 in Najaf) is an Iraqi actress and comedy artist.

Bio
Amani Alaa is an actress who was able to take her place among Iraqi comedian artists, and was born in Baghdad in 1994 and is not married.

Works

Series
 (Karekater)
 (Fitamen)
 (Habazboz)
 (Dolab Almadina)
 (Zaraq Waraq)

Plays
 (Play Fakhfh fi amreka)

Sound performance
 Alatak
 Shalash

External links
  An Interview with Amani Alaa on Alrasheed TV

References 

1994 births
Artists from Baghdad
Iraqi actresses
21st-century women artists
Iraqi women artists
Living people